Stuart Sorbie (born 7 September 1963) is a Scottish footballer who played as a forward for Livingston.

Playing career
He started his career with Alloa and scored 43 times in 147 games for the Wasps.

Sorbie's form earned him a move to St Johnstone in 1988.  After 38 appearances and 7 goals, the striker departed McDiarmid Park in the summer of 1989.

The striker then signed for Raith Rovers but only made a single goal in 14 appearances at Stark's Park before returning to Alloa on loan for the remainder of the 1989-1990 season.

Following his departure from Raith Rovers, Sorbie signed for Arbroath in 1990.  His goal scoring form improved at Gayfield Park as he netted 49 times in 149 appearances over 4 years for the Red Lichties.

In 1994, he signed for Meadowbank Thistle and made 32 appearances, scoring 5 times for the club. He remained at the club as they were named and relocated to Livingston, West Lothian in 1995.  He made 11 appearances for the new club without scoring, before departing in 1996.

Sorbie signed for Brechin in 1996 where he got the regular game time he didn't get at his former club.  He made 118 appearances and scored 23 times for the City.

Coaching career
He left Brechin in 2000 and took up a coaching role with East Stirlingshire.

In 2004, he was Harry Cairney's assistant at Arbroath.

Sorbie also assisted Harry Cairney at Annan between 2006-2012.  He remained at the club when Cairney tendered his resignation on 20 December 2012.

References

External links
Stuart Sorbie on Soccerbase

1963 births
Living people
Scottish footballers
Scottish Football League players
Association football forwards
Livingston F.C. players
Arbroath F.C. players
Alloa Athletic F.C. players
Brechin City F.C. players
East Stirlingshire F.C. players
Footballers from Glasgow